Aníbal António Cavaco Silva, GCC, GColL, GColIH (born 15 July 1939) is a Portuguese economist who served as the 19th president of Portugal, in office from 9 March 2006 to 9 March 2016. He had been previously prime minister of Portugal from 6 November 1985 to 28 October 1995. His 10-year tenure was the longest of any prime minister since António de Oliveira Salazar, and he was the first Portuguese prime minister to win an absolute parliamentary majority under the current constitutional system. He is best known for leading Portugal into the European Union.

Early life and career
Aníbal António Cavaco Silva was born in Boliqueime, Loulé, Algarve. He was initially an undistinguished student. As a 12-year-old, he flunked at the 3rd grade of the Commercial School, and his grandfather put him working on the farm as a punishment. After returning to school, Cavaco Silva went on to become an accomplished student. Cavaco Silva then went to Lisbon, where he took a vocational education course in accounting from "Instituto Comercial de Lisboa" (Instituto Superior de Contabilidade e Administração de Lisboa (ISCAL), today) in 1959. In parallel, he was admitted for university education at the Instituto Superior de Ciências Económicas e Financeiras de Lisboa (ISCEF) of the Technical University of Lisbon (UTL) (currently the Instituto Superior de Economia e Gestão (ISEG) of the University of Lisbon), and obtained in 1963, with distinction, a degree in economics and finance (he scored a mark of 16 out of 20). While studying in Lisbon, Cavaco Silva was an athlete of CDUL athletics department from 1958 to 1963. Between 1963 and 1964, he was drafted into the Portuguese Army Artillery for compulsory 11 month military service, serving in a battalion in Lourenco Marques in Portuguese Mozambique Cavaco Silva studied a graduate course at the University of York in England.

Returning to Portugal, he took up a post as assistant professor in ISCEF (1974), professor at the Catholic University of Portugal (1975), extraordinary professor at the New University of Lisbon (1979) and finally director of the Office of Studies of the Bank of Portugal.

Cavaco Silva has published several academic works in economics, including in subfields like monetary policy and monetary unions. He received an Honorary Doctorate from Scotland's Heriot-Watt University in 2009

Political career

Early years
Cavaco Silva joined the Social Democratic Party in 1974 and became the party leader in 1985.

Prime minister
The 1985 legislative election was complicated by the arrival of a new political party, the Democratic Renewal Party (PRD), which had been formed by the supporters of the President, António Ramalho Eanes. In the 250-member Assembly of the Republic, the nation's legislature, the PRD won 45 seats – at the expense of every party except Cavaco Silva's PSD.  Despite winning less than 30 percent of the popular vote, the PSD was the only traditional political party not to suffer substantial losses. Its 88 seats, in fact, represented a gain of 13 over the previous election. Accordingly, Cavaco Silva became prime minister on 6 November 1985.

Cavaco Silva headed a minority government. On most issues, his Social Democrats could rely on the 22 votes of the Social and Democratic Center Party (CDS), but the two parties' combined 110 votes fell 16 short of a parliamentary majority.  The Socialists and Communists held 57 and 38 seats respectively; Cavaco Silva could govern if the 45 members of the PRD, who held the balance of power, abstained.

According to a contemporary report in The New York Times, Cavaco Silva's first government presided over an "economic boom". The article described him as "pro-American" and committed to the European Community.

In 1987, the PRD withdrew its tacit support, and a parliamentary vote of no confidence forced President Mário Soares to call an early election. Cavaco Silva's Social Democrats captured 50.2 percent of the popular vote and 148 of the 250 seats in the legislature. Far behind were the Socialists, with only 60 seats, and the Communists, with 31. The CDS and the PRD were virtually wiped out, left with only four and seven seats, respectively.  This was the first time since the 1974 revolution that a single party had won an outright majority in the national parliament. At the time, it was also the largest majority that a Portuguese party had ever won in a free election.

Although the occurrence of economic growth and a public debt relatively well-contained as a result of the number of civil servants was increased from 485,368 in 1988 to 509,732 in 1991, which was a much lower increase than that which took place in the following years until 2011 marked by irrational and unsustainable State employment, from 1988 to 1993, during the government cabinets led by  Cavaco Silva, the Portuguese economy was radically changed. As a result, there was a sharp and rapid decrease in the output of tradable goods and a rise of the importance of the non-tradable goods sector in the Portuguese economy.

In the 1991 election Cavaco Silva's party had a majority even larger (50.6 percent) than the one of four years earlier.  He decided not to contest the 1995 election, and the PSD, lacking a leader of his stature, lost 48 seats and the election.

Post-premiership
Cavaco Silva contested the 1996 presidential election, but was defeated by the Mayor of Lisbon, Jorge Sampaio, the Socialist candidate. Retiring from politics, he served for several years as an advisor to the board of the Banco de Portugal (Bank of Portugal), but retired from this position in 2004. He then became a full professor at the School of Economics and Management of the Catholic University of Portugal, where he taught the undergraduate and MBA programs.

He is a member of the Club of Madrid and an honorary member of the  International Raoul Wallenberg Foundation.

President of the Republic

On 20 October 2005, Cavaco Silva announced his candidacy for the 2006 presidential election. He was elected President of the Republic on 22 January 2006 with 50.6% of votes cast, avoiding a run-off. He is the first elected center-right president in Portugal since 1974.  He is also the second former prime minister to be elected president, after Mário Soares.

He was sworn-in on 9 March 2006. He is also the president of the Portuguese Council of State.

Cavaco Silva's term was initially marked by a mutual understanding with the government led by Socialist José Sócrates, which he referred to as "strategic co-operation". 

The most controversial moment of his presidency was when the Assembly of the Republic passed a bill for the holding of a pre-legislative referendum on the legalization of abortion in Portugal without any restrictions in the 10 first weeks of pregnancy. After the parliamentary approval of the bill summoning the referendum, Cavaco Silva referred the matter to the Portuguese Constitutional Court, which declared both the proposed legalization and the referendum constitutional by a narrow 7-6 margin. Cavaco Silva, who could still have vetoed the referendum bill, decided to sign it into law, and thus allowed the referendum. The majority of the Portuguese electorate abstained from the referendum, but the vote for legalization prevailed among those who chose to cast their ballot.

Cavaco Silva was reelected president of Portugal on 23 January 2011 with 52,92% of the vote, and he took office for his second five-year term on 9 March 2011.

2015 constitutional crisis
At the general election on 4 October 2015 to the Assembly of the Republic, the unicameral Portuguese parliament, the right-wing government of Prime Minister Pedro Passos Coelho lost its majority, with center-left and far-left opposition parties gaining more than half of the seats. As Passos Coelho's own Social Democratic Party remained the largest in parliament, and still had the support of the much smaller CDS – People's Party, Cavaco Silva allowed Passos Coelho to continue as prime minister, giving him the first chance to form a new government. Passos Coelho was unable to find any new partners and was widely expected to stand down, but on 22 October Cavaco Silva invited him to form a new government, even if it were a minority government. On 24 October Cavaco Silva explained his thinking:

Antonio Costa, leader of the Socialist Party, called this a grave mistake and added "It is unacceptable to usurp the exclusive powers of parliament. The Socialists will not take lessons from Professor Cavaco Silva on the defence of our democracy." The Green politician Rui Tavares commented "The president has created a constitutional crisis. He is saying that he will never allow the formation of a government containing Leftists and Communists. People are amazed by what has happened." The opposition parties quickly announced their intention of bringing down the new government in a motion of rejection.

Eventually, Passos Coelho's government fell on a motion of no confidence, and the president appointed Antonio Costa, the leader of the Socialists, as prime minister in his place.

Family
Cavaco Silva married Maria Alves da Silva  at the Church of the Monastery of São Vicente de Fora, São Vicente de Fora, Lisbon, on 20 October 1963. The couple had a daughter Patricia, and a son Bruno. He has five grandchildren, four of whom were born to his daughter. One of them, António Montez, is a professional footballer.

His brother, Rogério Cavaco Silva, is a businessman and a victim of the Dominion of Melchizedek scam.

Awards and decorations

National honours
Source:
:
 Grand Collar of the Order of Liberty
 Grand Cross of the Sash of the Three Orders
 Grand Collar of the Military Order of the Tower and Sword
 Grand Cross of the Order of Christ
 Grand Collar of the Order of Prince Henry

Foreign honours
Source:
:
 Grand Star of the Decoration of Honour for Services to the Republic of Austria
:
 Grand Cross of the Order of the Southern Cross
:
 Grand Cross Special Class of the Order of Merit of the Federal Republic of Germany
:
 Knight Grand Cross of the Order of Orange-Nassau
:
 Grand Cross of the Order of St. Olav
:
 Knight of the Collar of the Order of Isabella the Catholic
  : 
 Collar of the Order of the State of Republic of Turkey

State visits

Cavaco Silva made state visits to countries in Europe, Africa, Asia and the Americas. In September 2006, on his first state visit, he visited Portugal's neighbour, Spain.

Electoral results

1996 Portuguese presidential election

Aníbal Cavaco Silva finished second with 2,595,131 votes (46.09%).

2006 Portuguese presidential election

Aníbal Cavaco Silva won the election with 2,773,431 votes (50.54%).

2011 Portuguese presidential election

Aníbal Cavaco Silva won the election with 2,231,956 votes (52.95%).

Bibliography
 Cavaco Silva, Autobiografia Política, in 2 Vols.

See also
Liberalism in Portugal

References

|-

|-

|-

|-

1939 births
21st-century Portuguese politicians
Alumni of the University of York
Academic staff of the Catholic University of Portugal
Living people
Members of the Assembly of the Republic (Portugal)
People from Loulé
20th-century Portuguese economists
Presidents of Portugal
Prime Ministers of Portugal
Finance ministers of Portugal
Social Democratic Party (Portugal) politicians
Technical University of Lisbon alumni

Collars of the Order of Isabella the Catholic
Grand Crosses of the Order of Christ (Portugal)
Grand Crosses Special Class of the Order of Merit of the Federal Republic of Germany
Grand Crosses with Golden Chain of the Order of Vytautas the Great
Recipients of the Collar of the Order of the Cross of Terra Mariana
Recipients of the Order of the Tower and Sword
Recipients of the Order of Timor-Leste
Recipients of the Order of the Star of Romania